, known as Lion-Man outside Japan, was a tokusatsu television series that aired on the Fuji Television Network in Japan in 1973. Produced by P Productions — the studio behind its previous tokusatsu series including Magma Taishi, Spectreman and Kaiketsu Lion-Maru, it was the second series in the Lion-Maru trilogy, and featured a third Maru-like character named Black Jaguar. It also reunites only two actors: Tetsuya Ushio as Shishimaru (Lion Maru) and Yoshitaka Fukushima as Jonosuke (Tiger Joe), since Akiko Kujo and Norihiko Umechi were not featured in the sequel series. This Lion-Maru is deemed "the Rolling Tempest Ninja Warrior."

Story
The series has its context in Feudal Japan where, for any warrior, more important than life itself was to maintain his honor. It tells the story of Dan Shishimaru, a 22-year-old samurai who, after having his brother Dan Kage Noshin killed by Nezuma, a human monster allied with the evil group Mantle, goes into battle with a desire for revenge and justice.

Cast
Shishimaru Dan/Lion Maru (voice): Tetsuya Ushio
Shinobu: Ryoko Miyano
Sankichi/Taro (ep 14): Tsunehiro Arai
Hyoba Kurokage/Black Jaguar (voice) (2-11 & 25) : Masaki Hayasaki
Jōnosuke Tora/Tiger Joe (voice): Yoshitaka Fukushima
Nijino Nanairo (17-20, 22 & 24): Naoyuki Sugano

Voice Actors
Mantle God: Kiyoshi Kobayashi
Agdar: Tōru Ōhira (ep 1), Yoshiaki Yoda (2-23)
Narrator/Monsters: Masaki Okabe
Kaiketsu Lion Man (voice) (ep 9): Tetsuya Ushio
Shizue (voice) (ep 17 & 18): Ryoko Miyano

Stunts
Fuun Lion-Maru: Kanehiro Nomiyama
Tiger Joe, Jr.: Kenzo Nakayama, Masami Yogawa
Kaiketsu Lion Man: Kazuo Kamoshida
Agdar: Hiroshi Mihara
Monsters: Hajime Araki, Hiromi Hara
Shizue (17 & 18): Noriko Egawa

Music
Opening Theme
 by  & 
Ending Theme
 by  &

International Broadcasts and Home Video
The only region in the world besides Japan to air all 25 episodes of this series was in Brazil back in 1989, where it was popularized. It aired on the now-defunct Rede Manchete under Lion-Man (but also Poderoso Lion Man as what the character is known there) with a Brazilian Portuguese dub and due to its' success, it caused them to also air the first series Kaiketsu Lion-Maru, afterwards, as well as its' followup Tetsujin Tiger Seven (where it aired under Tiger Mask there). The series was also released on home video by Top Tape.

External links
Fuun Lion-Maru DVD site

References

1973 Japanese television series debuts
1973 Japanese television series endings
Fictional ninja
Japanese television series with live action and animation
Ninja fiction
Tokusatsu television series